C3orf58 is a human gene. It was highlighted in a screen for genes possibly related to autism. The authors propose that the gene should be renamed Deleted in autism-1 (DIA1). Experiments in a rat neuronal cell culture model suggested that this gene may be regulated directly or indirectly by MEF2 site binding proteins.

See also
 Heritability of autism

References